Club Deportivo Azuqueca is a Spanish football team based in Azuqueca de Henares, Guadalajara, in the autonomous community of Castile-La Mancha. Founded in 1971 it plays in Tercera División – Group 18, holding home games at Estadio San Miguel, which holds 2,000 spectators.

Season to season

25 seasons in Tercera División

Current squad

References

External links
Futbolme team profile 

Football clubs in Castilla–La Mancha
Association football clubs established in 1971
1971 establishments in Spain
Province of Guadalajara